Velundu Vinaiyillai is a 1987 Tamil-language devotional film, directed by K. Shankar and produced by S. Valliammai. The film stars Vijayakanth, Ambika, M. N. Nambiar and Jai Ganesh.

Cast
Vijayakanth 
Ambika 
M. N. Nambiar 
Jai Ganesh
Delhi Ganesh 
Senthil 
Madhumohan
R. Shankaran
Typist Gopu
Vadivukkarasi

Soundtrack
The music was composed by M. S. Viswanathan.

References

External links
  
 

1987 films
Films scored by M. S. Viswanathan
1980s Tamil-language films
Films directed by K. Shankar